Byatarayanapura is an Assembly constituency under North Bangalore Lok Sabha constituency. Krishna Byre Gowda is currently the sitting MLA.

Members of Legislative Assembly

See also
 List of constituencies of Karnataka Legislative Assembly
 Bangalore North Lok Sabha Constituency

References 

Assembly constituencies of Karnataka